= Rhabdaerophilum =

Scientific classification
- Domain: Bacteria
- Kingdom: Pseudomonadati
- Phylum: Pseudomonadota
- Class: Alphaproteobacteria
- Order: Hyphomicrobiales
- Family: Rhabdaerophilaceae; Ming et al. 2020
- Genus: Rhabdaerophilum; Ming et al. 2020
- Species: R. calidifontis

Binomial name
- Rhabdaerophilum calidifontis Ming et al. 2020

Genus of bacteria

Rhabdaerophilum calidifontis is a species of Alphaproteobacteria. It is the only species in the genus Rhabdaerophilum and family Rhabdaerophilaceae.
